The Destroyer is a series of paperback novels about a U.S. government operative named Remo Williams, originally by Warren Murphy and Richard Sapir.  The first novel was published in 1971, although the manuscript was completed on June 25, 1963. Over 150 novels have been published. The main characters were adapted to film in Remo Williams: The Adventure Begins (1985).

Authors
The series was initially co-authored by Warren Murphy and Richard Sapir, with each writing a portion of each book separately. In the late 1970s, the relationship between the two became tense, and Sapir withdrew. In the early 1980s, Murphy began using ghostwriters to help with the series, among them his wife Molly Cochran. In the mid-1980s, Sapir returned to participating in the series.

In the late 1980s, Will Murray took over the sole responsibility of writing the series, having written several previous books with either Murphy or Sapir. After Sapir's death, Murray continued the series until the late 1990s. When Murray left after novel #107, three novels were written by interim ghostwriters (#108 & #110 by Mike Newton; #109 by Alan Philipson). Jim Mullaney took over for novels #111-#131, followed by two more by Newton. Tim Somheil was ghostwriter from #134 through #145. Marvel Comics writer Doug Murray wrote two related novels in the series, both involving the Destroyer's battle with a werewolf.

The last Gold Eagle Publishing book, Dragon Bones, was released in October 2006. On July 11, 2006, it was announced that The Destroyer would be moving to Tor Books. Somheil was replaced by Mullaney, who co-wrote the new novels with Warren Murphy. The first Tor novel, The New Destroyer: Guardian Angel, was published in May 2007, accompanied by a re-release of three older novels collected as The Best of the Destroyer. The second new novel, Choke Hold, was published October 31, followed by Dead Reckoning in April 2008 and Killer Ratings on July 28 of that year.

In 2002 Murphy started his own publishing house, Ballybunion, as a vehicle for Destroyer spin-off books. Ballybunion, now known as Destroyer Books, has reprinted The Assassin's Handbook, as well as the original works Destroyer World: The Assassin's Handbook II , Destroyer World: The Movie That Never Was (a screenplay he and Richard Sapir wrote for a Destroyer movie that was never optioned), The Way of the Assassin (the wisdom of Chiun), and New Blood, a collection of short stories written by fans of the series.

In 2011 the rights to most of The Destroyer novels reverted to Warren Murphy. They are being released as e-books. Murphy is also reissuing many of the older titles in print format.

In 2017 Gene Donovan Press began publishing new books in the series (starting with Bully Pulpit) written by author R.J. Carter. #151 and #152 show a writing credit of "Warren Murphy with R.J. Carter" while #153 shows "R.J. Carter with Warren Murphy and Richard Sapir".

Description
The series' hero is Remo Williams, a Newark cop framed for a crime and sentenced to death. His death is faked by the government so he can be trained as an assassin for CURE, a secret organization set up by President Kennedy to defend the country by working outside the law. The head of CURE is Harold W. Smith, a man selected by the President not only for his brilliant mind but also because of his integrity. Smith is a former law instructor at Yale and served in the Office of Strategic Services during World War II.

Remo's trainer and father figure is Chiun, a deadly assassin and the last Master of Sinanju. It has also emerged that Remo is the Avatar of Shiva, as prophesied in the legends of Sinanju. In 1985, a revision of The Assassin's Handbook was published as Inside Sinanju, a companion book to the series. This is narrated primarily in the first person, from Chiun's perspective. It covers anecdotes as well as information on the various villains and history of the series.

The series' basic formula had taken shape by about the third book, but many elements have been introduced into later stories about the early days of Remo's training. In the first book, the word Sinanju is not used at all to describe the martial arts that Chiun teaches Remo.  Zen, karate, aikido and judo are used instead. Remo has many trainers for other aspects of being an undercover operative; he is taught to use different types of firearms, and trained in close-quarters assassination.  He smokes tobacco, drinks alcohol, and eats red meat, all activities that would later prove harmful or impossible as his body was changed by the harsh Sinanju training regimen. Remo uses a gun to shoot somebody, although it is only to wound, and all his actual kills are hand-to-hand. He does make a conscious choice not to use weapons, after a fight in which he kills a man who had been pointing a gun at him. He realizes that Chiun never carried a gun and is over 70, whereas MacCleary, who had told him to always carry a gun, is dead. The retelling of Remo's origin in the story "The Day Remo Died" in The Assassin's Handbook and in The Destroyer #120-121 and #128 resolve later developments more fully with his origins.

Villains
Remo and Chiun have encountered a number of colorful villains, both human and superhuman.  Their foes have run the gamut of pulp fiction, from mobsters to mad scientists to satires of famous real people.  Notable examples include:

 Mr. Gordons, a shapeshifting android created by NASA with limited emotional capabilities.
 Cartoonist Uncle Sam Beasley, revived from cryogenic sleep and armed with an animatronic eye and hand.
 Super-soldier Elizu Roote, a cyborg with electricity-based superpowers.
 Friend, an artificial intelligence dedicated to making as much money as possible.
 Nuihc ("Chiun" reversed) the Renegade, Chiun's first pupil and nephew. Once trained, Nuihc deserted his duty of providing for the village of Sinanju to seek personal profit.  This forced Chiun out of retirement to train Remo Williams.
 Jeremiah Purcell (a.k.a. the Dutchman), Nuihc's protege and a strong psychic and pyrokinetic.
 Kali, the Hindu goddess who is linked to Remo.
 The Master, a Chinese vampire.
 Wu Ming Shi (a.k.a. Dr. Fu Manchu)
 Sagwa, the bodyguard and right-hand man of Wu Ming Shi, a pastiche of martial artist Bruce Lee
 Rasputin, an undead Russian monk.
 Dr. Judith White, a scientist specializing in genetic engineering who changed herself into a weretiger.
 The Krahsheevah, a Russian soldier with the ability to walk through walls and transmit his physical form by converting into energy and traveling on phone lines, as well as other unique powers.

 
Given Remo and Chiun's talents as assassins, few of their enemies have survived their initial encounter with them, but some of the above have managed to escape and return in subsequent stories.

Other media

Film

In 1985, The Destroyer concept was adapted for the theatrical movie Remo Williams: The Adventure Begins, starring Fred Ward as Williams, Joel Grey as Chiun and Wilford Brimley as Harold W. Smith. The film shows the first meeting of Remo and Chiun, and centers on a corrupt weapons manufacturer who is selling guns to the US Army.

In 2014 Sony Pictures hired director Shane Black, a fan of the book series, to begin work on a script by Jim Uhls and The Destroyer series co-author James Mullaney. In a 2018 interview Black said the project was "still very much in play", and he planned to work on the script with Fred Dekker and Jim Mullaney. He praised Mullaney's books in the series as equal to those of Warren Murphy and Richard Sapir's.

Television

In 1988, an American television pilot, Remo Williams, aired but did not lead to a series. It was a follow-up to the first movie incorporating footage from the movie in the opening credits.  It starred Jeffrey Meek as Williams, Roddy McDowall as Chiun, and Stephen Elliott as Harold W. Smith and is loosely based on the novella "The Day Remo Died". Set one year after the events of the feature film, the pilot episode (titled "The Prophecy") was directed by Christian I. Nyby II and the teleplay written by Steven Hensley and J. Miyoko Hensley. The episode featured guest stars Carmen Argenziano, Judy Landers, and Andy Romano. Craig Safan, who scored the movie, returned to provide the music for the pilot; his score was later released by Intrada Records (paired with Safan's score for the TV movie Mission of the Shark: The Saga of the U.S.S. Indianapolis).

The television pilot had not been seen since 1988 until the Encore cable television channel began airing it in the summer of 2009.

On December 8, 2022, it was announced that Gordon Smith will be adapting a TV series version of The Destroyer for Sony Pictures Television with Adrian Askarieh executive producing.

Comic books
There have been several Destroyer comic book and magazine series published by various companies including Marvel.

Audio book
Books 95–122 in the series were released in audiobook format by GraphicAudio.

Books 3, 12 and 19 in the series were also released in audiobook format.  These were produced by Speaking Volumes, LLC.

Assassin's Playoff was published by Speaking Volumes, number 20 in the list of audiobook format. Not sure if the three book numbers are incorrect or if there was a fourth release.

Series listing 

 Created, The Destroyer (1971)
 Death Check (1972)
 Chinese Puzzle (1972)
 Mafia Fix (1972)
 Dr. Quake (1972)
 Death Therapy (1972)
 Union Bust (1973)
 Summit Chase (1973)
 Murder's Shield (1973)
 Terror Squad (1973)
 Kill or CURE (1973)
 Slave Safari (1973)
 Acid Rock (1973)
 Judgment Day (1974)
 Murder Ward (1974)
 Oil Slick (1974)
 Last War Dance (1974)
 Funny Money (1975)
 Holy Terror (1975)
 Assassin's Play-Off
 Deadly Seeds
 Brain Drain
 Child's Play
 King's Curse
 Sweet Dreams
 In Enemy Hands
 The Last Temple
 Ship of Death
 The Final Death
 Mugger Blood
 The Head Men
 Killer Chromosomes
 Voodoo Die
 Chained Reaction
 Last Call
 Power Play
 Bottom Line
 Bay City Blast
 Missing Link
 Dangerous Games
 Firing Line
 Timber Line
 Midnight Man
 Balance of Power
 Spoils of War
 Next of Kin
 Dying Space
 Profit Motive
 Skin Deep
 Killing Time
 Shock Value
 Fool's Gold
 Time Trial
 Last Drop
 Master's Challenge
 Encounter Group
 Date With Death
 Total Recall
 The Arms of Kali
 The End of the Game
 Lords of the Earth
 The Seventh Stone
 The Sky Is Falling
 The Last Alchemist
 Lost Yesterday
 Sue Me
 Look Into My Eyes
 An Old-Fashioned War
 Blood Ties
 The Eleventh Hour
 Return Engagement
 Sole Survivor
 Line of Succession
 Walking Wounded
 Rain of Terror
 The Final Crusade
 Coin of the Realm
 Blue Smoke And Mirrors
 Shooting Schedule
 Death Sentence
 Hostile Takeover
 Survival Course
 Skull Duggery
 Ground Zero
 Blood Lust
 Arabian Nightmare
 Mob Psychology
 The Ultimate Death
 Dark Horse
 Ghost in the Machine
 Cold Warrior
 The Last Dragon
 Terminal Transmission
 Feeding Frenzy
 High Priestess
 Infernal Revenue
 Identity Crisis
 Target of Opportunity
 The Color of Fear
 Last Rites
 Bidding War
 Unite and Conquer
 Engines Of Destruction
 Angry White Mailmen
 Scorched Earth
 White Water
 Feast or Famine
 Bamboo Dragon
 American Obsession
 Never Say Die
 Prophet of Doom
 Brain Storm
 The Empire Dreams
 Failing Marks
 Misfortune Teller
 The Final Reel
 Deadly Genes
 Killer Watts
 Fade To Black
 The Last Monarch
 A Pound of Prevention
 Syndication Rites
 Disloyal Opposition
 By Eminent Domain
 The Wrong Stuff
 Air Raid
 Market Force
 The End of the Beginning
 Father To Son
 Waste Not, Want Not
 Unnatural Selection
 Wolf's Bane
 Troubled Waters
 Bloody Tourists
 Political Pressure
 Unpopular Science
 Industrial Evolution
 No Contest
 Dream Thing
 Dark Ages
 Frightening Strikes
 Mindblower
 Bad Dog
 Holy Mother
 Dragon Bones
 Choke Hold
 Guardian Angel
 Dead Reckoning
 Killer Ratings
 The End of the World
 Bully Pulpit
 Continental Divide
 Monumental Terror

The Assassin's Handbook (1983) features a novella The Day Remo Died. It was republished in 1985 as Inside Sinanju.
Remo: The Adventure Begins... (1985): a novelization of the script by Christopher Wood 
The Best of the Destroyer (May 1, 2007): a collection of three early Destroyer books: Chinese Puzzle, Slave Safari, and Assassin's Playoff.

In 2007, Tor Books published four books in the series; due to contractual issues, the titles were changed to "The New Destroyer", although the characters were unchanged. The numbering also restarted, so the first book is called "The New Destroyer #1", rather than "Destroyer #146".

 Guardian Angel (May 2007)
 Choke Hold (October 2007)
 Dead Reckoning (April 2008)
 Killer Ratings (July 2008)

The series also includes several novellas, now available online from many of the different e-reader companies:

 The Day Remo Died (a reissue of the story from The Assassin's Handbook)
 Savage Song (March 2012)
 Number Two (October 2012)

Even though both of the original creators are deceased, new books in the series are still being published:

 150. The End of the World (December 5, 2012)
 151. Bully Pulpit (February 18, 2016)
 152. Continental Divide (January 2018)
 153. Monumental Terror (September 2019)

See also
 Able Team
 Death Merchant
 Nick Carter-Killmaster
 Phoenix Force
 Mack Bolan

References

External links
 DestroyerBooks.com — the official site of the Destroyer series
 Sinanju.net
 Sinanju.com

Fictional secret agents and spies
Fictional assassins
Novel series
Book series introduced in 1971
sv:Remo